Walter Hotot (fl. 1390) of Exton, Devon, was an English politician.

He was a Member (MP) of the Parliament of England for Totnes in January 1390.

References

English MPs January 1390
Members of the Parliament of England (pre-1707) for Totnes